Mehtab Hossain (born 5 September 1985) is an Indian professional footballer and coach who last played for Madan Maharaj as a defensive midfielder.

During his career, Hossain has played for both of the Kolkata football giants, Mohun Bagan and East Bengal. He played with East Bengal for ten seasons, winning the Federation Cup three times. He also managed to gain 31 caps for the India national football team between 2005 and 2014, scoring twice for the country. On 2019, Mehtab started his coaching career as manager at Southern Samity in 2019-20 Calcutta Premier Division. He joined Bharatiya Janata Party on 21 July 2020 by taking party flag from BJP president of West Bengal Dilip Ghosh, but within 24 hours he changed his decision and resigned.

Career
Mehtab is a product of IFA's Baby League, which was the brain child of Legendary Football Secretary Shri Prodyut Dutta, which promoted football amongst the children and youth of Bengal. 

It was reported in June 2012, that he was on trial with Falkirk, Airdrie, and Exeter City FC on recommendation of his former teammate Alan Gow.

He scored his first goal in the 2012–13 I-League in their penultimate match in the 6–0 win against United Sikkim F.C. on 8 May at Kolkata. Then he scored in the 5–1 win in Round of 16 match in 2013 AFC Cup match against Yangon United F.C. on 15 May at Kolkata.

On 2015, Mehtab retired from international duty after being omitted from the 26-man squad for World Cup Qualifiers.

Mehtab had more than 400 appearances in his career at six Indian clubs.

East Bengal 
Hossain joined East Bengal in 2007. He had 255 appearances for the club over a span of ten years.

Kerala Blasters
On 2014, he was picked by Kerala Blasters FC of Indian Super League on a three years contract.

Jamshedpur
On 23 July 2017, Hossain was selected in the third round of the 2017–18 ISL Players Draft by Jamshedpur for the 2017–18 Indian Super League season. He made his debut for the club during the first ever match on 18 November 2017 against NorthEast United. He started the match and played 69 minutes as Jamshedpur drew 0–0.

Mohun Bagan
After ending the season with Jamshedpur, Hossain reportedly decided not to renew his contract with the club since he wanted to return to Kolkata and be near his family. Despite stating previously that he would like to return to East Bengal, it was reported that he was in talks with Mohun Bagan. Then, on 22 May 2018, it was officially announced that Hossain had signed with Mohun Bagan, after last playing for them 12 years prior.

In 2021, he came out of retirement to play for Madan Maharaj FC in the I-League Qualifiers where he is also the mentor.

Honours

India
 SAFF Championship: 2005; runner-up: 2013
 Nehru Cup: 2012

East Bengal
 Federation Cup (3): 2007, 2009–10, 2010, 2012
 Super Cup (1): 2011
 IFA Shield (1): 2012
 Calcutta Football League (7): 2010, 2011, 2012–13, 2013–14, 2014–15, 2015–16, 2016–17

Mohun Bagan
Calcutta Football League (1): 2018–19

Career statistics

Club

International stats

References

External links
 Jamshedpur FC Profile.
 
 

Indian footballers
1985 births
Living people
Mohun Bagan AC players
ONGC FC players
East Bengal Club players
I-League players
Kerala Blasters FC players
Jamshedpur FC players
Indian Super League players
India international footballers
Footballers from Kolkata
Association football midfielders
Kerala Blasters FC draft picks
Tollygunge Agragami FC players